Lombo may refer to
 Lombo language, in the Kele language group of Bantu languages
 Lombo, Democratic Republic of the Congo, a community in Équateur province 
 Lombo Airport, which serves Lombo, Democratic Republic of the Congo
 Lombo Pocket Watch, a champion Australian grey Standardbred colt foaled on 16 October 2003
 Lombo-Bouenguidi Department, a department of Ogooué-Lolo Province in eastern Gabon
 Ana Maria Lombo, an American-Colombian singer/songwriter and dancer
 Turumbu people, who live in the Isangi area of the Tshopo Province on both sides of the Congo River